Longstreet is an unincorporated community in Quitman County, Mississippi. Longstreet is located on Mississippi Highway 3 southwest of Lambert.

References

Unincorporated communities in Quitman County, Mississippi
Unincorporated communities in Mississippi